Sherman Quinn Mack (born March 1972) is a lawyer from Albany outside of Baton Rouge, Louisiana, who is a Republican member of the Louisiana House of Representatives from District 95 in Livingston Parish.
 
Mack was elected on October 22, 2011, to succeed Walker Hines, who held the seat for one term when it was based, prior to redistricting, in Orleans Parish. In the nonpartisan blanket primary, Mack received 6,526 votes (61.2 percent), compared to 3,449 (32.4 percent) for Democrat Lonnie Watts and 682 ballots (6.4 percent) for Independent Matthew Mitchell.
 
On April 5, 2012, Mack voted against successful bills to authorize charter schools and to establish a school voucher program. He also opposed the plan to amend teacher tenure policy.

Mack also works as an attorney in Livingston Parish.

References

 

1972 births
21st-century American politicians
Living people
Louisiana lawyers
Republican Party members of the Louisiana House of Representatives
People from Livingston Parish, Louisiana
Southeastern Louisiana University alumni
Southern University Law Center alumni